Supreme Constitutional Court may refer to:
Supreme Constitutional Court of Egypt
Supreme Constitutional Court of Syria